Shamsher Singh (born 29 July 1997) is an Indian field hockey player who plays as a forward. He made his international debut for the national senior team at the 2019 Men's Ready Steady Tokyo Hockey Tournament.

References

External links
Shamsher Singh at Hockey India

1997 births
Living people
Field hockey players from Punjab, India
Sportspeople from Amritsar district
Indian male field hockey players
Male field hockey forwards
Olympic field hockey players of India
Field hockey players at the 2020 Summer Olympics
Olympic bronze medalists for India
Medalists at the 2020 Summer Olympics
Olympic medalists in field hockey
Field hockey players at the 2022 Commonwealth Games
Commonwealth Games silver medallists for India
Commonwealth Games medallists in field hockey
Recipients of the Arjuna Award
2023 Men's FIH Hockey World Cup players
Medallists at the 2022 Commonwealth Games